Alma Muriel del Sordo (20 October 1951 – 5 January 2014), known artistically as Alma Muriel, was a Mexican actress who appeared in plays, films, and telenovelas, best known for her role as Irene del Conde / Lucrecia Treviño in Televisa's telenovela El extraño retorno de Diana Salazar (1988).

Muriel died from a heart attack on 5 January 2014, aged 62, in Playa del Carmen, Quintana Roo.

Filmography

Telenovelas

Films

Awards and nominations

Premios TVyNovelas

References

External links

1951 births
2014 deaths
Mexican telenovela actresses
Mexican television actresses
Mexican film actresses
Mexican stage actresses
Actresses from Mexico City
20th-century Mexican actresses
21st-century Mexican actresses